The Policía Nacional Civil (Guatemala) (Spanish: Policía Nacional Civil de Guatemala or PNC) is the police force of Guatemala and is an agency of the Guatemalan Ministry of the Interior. The PNC is in charge of protecting public order.

History 

Upon the signing of the Peace Accords in 1996, the Policía Nacional Civil (PNC) was founded on the 17th of July in 1997 by merging the former National Police and Treasury Guard. Immediately, the force was expanded across all departments of Guatemala, and by August 1999 (just two years later), the PNC managed to cover all 22 departments.

Currently, six district headquarters, twenty-seven police stations, one hundred and twenty-seven stations, and 343 substations have been deployed across Guatemala. Eight mobile units may also be deployed in Guatemala City to violent areas to control crime.

The PNC training was coordinated by the European Union (EU), which developed the "Program of Support for the National Security Policy" through the Spanish Civil Guard (GCE) in 1997. In terms of criminal investigation, the PNC received support from ICITAP (International Criminal Investigative Training Assistance Program of the U.S. Department of Justice), and instruction and training in human rights were in charge of the strengthening program of the MINUGUA PNC.

In 2006, a police force called GPC (Civil Protection Guard) was created, the function of which was to protect citizens and ensure public order in areas of high criminal risk. It serves as support to the National Civil Police in those tasks.

In response to pressure from the Mexican government in 2019, the PNC has been called upon to stymy the progression of Central American migrant caravans approaching the Mexico to the North before they can reach the border. The PNC also has played an important part around election season ensuring fair and safe democratic experiences for Guatemalan voters across the country. Between June and July 2019, DISETUR and DIPRONA members underwent trainings in basic trauma management with LFR International.

Divisions 

 Technical Secretariat (STO)
 Division of Joint Operations (DOC)
 Market Police Division (POLIMERC)
 Division of Special Police Forces (DIFEP)
 Division of Personnel Protection and Security (DPPS)
 Division of Supervision and Control of Private Security Companies (DSCESP)
 Tourism Security Division (DISETUR)
 Division of Protection of Nature (DIPRONA)
 Division of Ports, Airports and Border Posts (DIPAFRONT)
 Motorized Division (DM)

Armament

Ranks
The rank structure of the police is as follows.

See also 

 Ministry of the Interior (Guatemala)

References

External links 
 http://mingob.gob.gt/category/noticias/policia-nacional-civil/

Law enforcement in Guatemala